HEYWIRE  is an initiative of ABC Radio through ABC Rural aimed at giving a voice to the issues and aspirations of regional/rural youth; raising awareness about these issues within the broader community; and providing a unique issues-based training opportunity for young community leaders from regional /rural areas. It does this through two clear initiatives:
  
 by producing radio pieces concerning their own personal experiences, ideas, reflections and hopes. The radio pieces are broadcast on the ABC national networks and ABC Local Radio.
 by bringing the finalists together to participate in the Heywire Canberra Youth Issues Forum.

Background 

Between 1994 and 1997 the ABC's Rural Woman of the Year Award recognised the valuable contribution women make to the rural sector. Having established this ongoing event, in 1998 the ABC shifted the focus of its commitment to rural Australia to youth and introduced Heywire.

Heywire exists to find out how the young people of rural and regional Australia think and react to their world. Heywire grew out of the ABC's commitment to regional and rural Australia and its purpose was to hear from the direct voice of young people about their concerns, issues, hopes and experience of living and working in regional and rural Australia.

Since Heywire began more than 5,000 young people have put their voice forward.

About the competition 
Heywire is open to young people aged between 16 and 22 years who live outside Australia's major cities. These young people are invited to submit a script for a three-minute radio story about what life is like for them.

Entry forms are distributed to all post-primary schools and tertiary institutions in regional Australia. They are available from ABC regional radio stations, ABC shops and centres and through any organisation or industry wishing to encourage young people to participate.

Entries are judged in the regions and one winner is chosen from each of approximately 40 ABC radio regions around Australia.

The winning entry is professionally produced by the ABC and broadcast during the summer months on the ABC – on regional and metropolitan Local Radio stations, on Triple J, nationally on Radio National, through Radio Australia and via ABC online.

The Heywire Youth Issues Forum 
Each winner is invited to take part in the Heywire Youth Issues Forum which is held in February in Canberra at the Australian Institute of Sport.

The purpose of the Heywire Youth Issues Forum is to give young people the skills to get up and have their say and be heard, not just on radio but in their communities. The five-day Forum focuses on communication and leadership skills as well as understanding the processes of government.  Part of the Forum involves developing a proposal around an issue and presenting this to an expert panel.

The Forum also provides the opportunity for participants to meet and network with their local Members of Parliament, other politicians and government officials, along with relevant community and industry representatives.

The 40 Hour Drought 
The 40 Hour Drought was an initiative of the Heywire Youth Issues Forum held in February 2007 was the challenge set by ABC Local Radio as a nationwide campaign to encourage people to experience what it is like to live with a limited amount of water.

Kicking off at 7am on Wednesday 21 March and finishing at 11pm on Thursday 22 March participants were asked to register and track their progress on a water usage chart. A website  was established and water saving tips and the latest 40 Hour Drought News.

The brainchild of four Heywirers, Gabrielle Connolly from Mitchell in Queensland, David McPherson from Streatham in Victoria, Letitia Irwin from North Rockhampton in Queensland and Martin McConnon form Stonor in Tasmania, the 40 Hour Drought was  Heywire in action – and ABC Local Radio plan to conduct another 40 Hour Drought in 2008.

Notes and references

External links
ABC Heywire
ABC Rural
ABC Water Website
 ABC Local Radio
 Australian Broadcasting Corporation

Australian Broadcasting Corporation radio
Australian radio networks
1998 establishments in Australia
1998 radio programme debuts